Devilsdorp is a South African four-part true crime documentary television series directed by David Enright and narrated by Jana Marx. It depicts and analyses the 11 killings in Krugersdorp, West Rand by the group Electus per Deus (Chosen by God) between 2012 and 2016, dubbed the Appointment Murders and the Satanic Murders. It was released on Showmax on 29 July 2021.

An official companion podcast hosted by Nicole Engelbrecht was released alongside the series.

Episodes

Production
Research for the project took place over the course of 18 months, incorporating real-life interviews. It was co-created and developed by Kristen Broberg and Executive Producer, Wim Steyn (IdeaCandy) and directed by David Enright. The series was edited by Nikki Comninos and Christiaan Scheepers. Jana Marx, an investigative journalist who wrote The Krugersdorp Cult Killings: Inside Cecilia Steyn's Reign of Terror, narrated and was consulted for the series.

Reception
Met with both critical and audience acclaim, the series broke the Showmax record for most watched hours in its first week of any series or film on the platform.

Awards and nominations

References

External links

Devilsdorp  on Showmax

Showmax original programming
2020s documentary television series
2020s South African television series
2021 South African television series debuts
Documentary television series about crime
South African documentary television series
Television series about cults
True crime television series